Alaviyeh (also Romanized as ‘Alavīyeh) is a village in Nadushan Rural District, Khezrabad District, Saduq County, Yazd Province, Iran. At the 2006 census, its population was 50, in 20 families.

References 

Populated places in Saduq County